Truckers is a British stop motion animated series, an adaptation of the first book of Terry Pratchett's The Nome Trilogy, produced in the United Kingdom by Cosgrove Hall for TV, then released on VHS, though edited together into a feature-length film. The series consisted of 13 ten-minute episodes.

Plot
Masklin the Nome and his companions flee their unsustainable motorway-verge home and discover an alien race of tiny Humans known as Nomes living in a department store scheduled for demolition. Things are complicated by the store Nomes' religion, which states ‘The Store’ consists of the entire universe, and denies the existence of the ‘outside’.

Masklin discovers from a mysterious object simply called 'The Thing' that all Nomes are descended from extraterrestrial explorers who crashed on Earth thousands of years ago. The Thing, actually a sentient computer from the original Nome starship, helps Masklin plan the escape from the doomed store. Through skill, courage and sheer good luck, Masklin and his friends manage to successfully evacuate the store Nomes before their home is destroyed.

Production and notes
The puppets were built by Mackinnon & Saunders. The puppets were created from foam latex.

Some of the interior shots of Arnold Bros was filmed in Lewis's Department Store in Manchester.

Some of the surviving puppets are on public display at the Cosgrove Hall Exhibition in Manchester.

Episodes

Cast
Masklin — Joe McGann
Grimma — Debra Gillett
Granny Morkie, Baroness Del Icatessen — Rosalie Williams
Torrit, Count De Ironmongri – John Jardine
The Thing — Edward Kelsey
Angalo De Haberdasheri – Nigel Carrington
Duke De Haberdasheri – David Scase
Dorcas — Brian Trueman
The Abbot — Sir Michael Hordern
Gurder — Brian Southwood
Mr. Mert, Vinto Pimmie — Jimmy Hibbert
Dave the Policeman — Rob Rackstraw

Crew
Directed by Jackie Cockle, Francis Vose, Chris Taylor (each episode had one director)
Produced by Jackie Cockle
Executive producer; John Hamberly
Adapted by Brian Trueman
Edited by Zyggy Markiewicz
Music; Colin Towns
Film Editor: Zyggy Markiewicz
Assistant Film Editors: Stephen Perry, Jane Hicks
Music Editor: Garry Hardman

Novelization
The series was made into a short hardcover book published by Ladybird Press in 1992. The book included colour photos from the series.

References

External links
Toonhound

1992 British television series debuts
1992 British television series endings
1990s British children's television series
British children's animated action television series
British stop-motion animated television series
English-language television shows
ITV children's television shows
British television shows based on children's books
Television series by Fremantle (company)
Television series by FremantleMedia Kids & Family
Television shows produced by Thames Television
Television series by Cosgrove Hall Films
Adaptations of works by Terry Pratchett